Tore Nilsen may refer to:

 Tore Nilsen (footballer, born 1933)
 Tore Nilsen (footballer, born 1960) (born 1960), Norwegian football defender
 Tore Falch Nilsen (1948–2008), Norwegian ice hockey player